Christopher Francis Baines Paul Rudd (born 9 December 1963 in Sutton Coldfield) is an English former cricketer. He was a right-handed batsman and a right-arm off-break bowler. Rudd had played in the Second XI Championship in 1982 and 1984, before starting his first-class county career.

In 1985 and 1986 he played Minor Counties cricket for Devon. He played his first County Championship game in 1986, against Essex, debuting as a lower-order batsman. Rudd was part of the 1987 Derbyshire Second XI team which won the Bain Dawes Trophy in 1987. He also played List A cricket for Devon, and for the Warwickshire Second XI, and in 1994 played for Marylebone Cricket Club.

Rudd was a lower-order batsman, who commonly batted at number nine thanks to the existence of tailending pair Devon Malcolm and Ole Mortensen.

References

1963 births
English cricketers
Living people
Derbyshire cricketers
Devon cricketers